Estradiol diundecylenate (brand name Etrosteron), or estradiol diundecenoate, also known as 17β-estradiol 3,17β-diundec-10-enoate, is a semisynthetic steroidal estrogen and an estrogen ester – specifically, the 3,17β-diundecylenate ester of estradiol – which was previously marketed in Argentina.

See also
 Estradiol undecylenate
 Estradiol diundecylate
 Estradiol undecylate
 List of estrogen esters § Estradiol esters

References

Abandoned drugs
Estradiol esters
Undecylenate esters